These are the RPM magazine Dance number-one hits of 1998.

Chart history

See also
1998 in Canadian music
List of RPM number-one dance singles chart (Canada)

References

1998 in Canadian music
Canada Dance
Dance 1998
RPM electronic dance music chart
Dance music